Ronnie Abrams (born June 3, 1968 in New York City, New York) is a United States district judge of the United States District Court for the Southern District of New York.

Early life and education

Abrams is one of two children born to Efrat Abrams and Floyd Abrams, a First Amendment lawyer. Her brother, Dan Abrams, is a television personality and internet entrepreneur who currently serves as legal analyst for Good Morning America. She was raised in New York City's Upper East Side, where she attended the Dalton School. Abrams received a Bachelor of Arts from Cornell University in 1990. In 1993, she received a Juris Doctor from Yale Law School. After completing law school, she served as a law clerk for Judge Thomas P. Griesa of the United States District Court for the Southern District of New York.

Professional career
From 1998 to 2008, Abrams worked as a federal prosecutor in the Southern District of New York, where she served as Chief of the General Crimes Unit from 2005 to 2007 and Deputy Chief of the Criminal Division from 2007 to 2008. She received the United States Department of Justice Director's Award for Superior Performance for two cases. The first case involved the convictions of members of a Colombian gang wanted for the murder of a New York City police detective and some 100 armed robberies; the second case was for the convictions of leaders of the Bloods gang. In 2008, Abrams returned to Davis Polk as Special Counsel for Pro Bono. She had previously worked at the firm as a litigation associate from 1994 to 1998. While at Davis Polk, Ms. Abrams served as counsel to the New York State Justice Task Force, a task force created by New York State Chief Judge Jonathan Lippman to examine the causes of wrongful convictions and make recommendations for changes to safeguard against such convictions in the future. Abrams is also an adjunct professor at Columbia Law School, where she teaches about investigating and prosecuting federal criminal cases.

Federal judicial service
Senator Kirsten Gillibrand recommended Abrams to fill a judicial vacancy on the United States District Court for the Southern District of New York. On July 28, 2011, President Barack Obama formally nominated Abrams to the Southern District of New York. She replaced Judge Lewis A. Kaplan, who assumed senior status in 2011. The Senate Judiciary Committee held a hearing on her nomination on October 4, 2011, and reported her nomination to the floor on November 3, 2011. On March 22, 2012, the Senate confirmed Abrams by a 96–2 vote. She received her commission on March 23, 2012.

In 2015, Judge Abrams, together with another judge, created and began to run the "Young Adult Opportunity Program," a judicially supervised pretrial program for non-violent young adults charged in the Southern District of New York.   The Program provides young adult defendants with access to employment, counseling, and treatment resources. Program participants, if they are successful, may receive a shorter sentence, or even a reduction, deferral or dismissal of the charges against them. Judge Abrams has also been involved in other criminal justice reform efforts, including the creation of reentry courts in her district.

Notable cases
In October 2013, Carmen Segarra filed suit against the Federal Reserve in an action Judge Abrams presided over, alleging that she was terminated due to reporting to her superiors that the Goldman Sachs Group did not have a firmwide conflict-of-interest policy. Segarra alleged that her termination violated the whistleblower protection provisions of the Federal Deposit Insurance Act, . On April 23, 2014, Judge Abrams dismissed the suit. The Court of Appeals for the Second Circuit affirmed the dismissal, calling some of Segarra's arguments, "entirely speculative, meritless and frankly quite silly."

In 2016, Abrams was assigned to preside over a case in which Donald Trump and Jeffrey Epstein are accused by the plaintiff of having raped her in the 1990s, when the plaintiff was thirteen years old. The complaint was voluntarily dismissed without prejudice by the Plaintiff in September 2016.

In January 2017, Abrams was assigned to preside over a pending case in which Donald Trump was sued by a nonprofit group, Citizens for Responsibility and Ethics in Washington, over an alleged violation by Trump of the Foreign and  Domestic Emoluments Clauses of the United States Constitution. On July 11, 2017, Judge Abrams recused herself from the case when her husband, Greg Andres, began talks to join Special Counsel Robert Mueller's staff investigating Russian meddling in the 2016 election.

In April 2018, Judge Abrams presided over the trial of an ex-U.S. Army Sergeant and two other men who were convicted of participating in a murder for hire of a woman in the Philippines. The primary cooperating witness was Paul Le Roux, a notorious crime lord who testified about the covert world of mercenary work as well as selling missile technology to Iran and smuggling weapons to rebels and warlords.

In June 2018, Judge Abrams presided over a trial of individuals charged with helping run a scheme, masterminded by serial fraudster Jason Galanis, to defraud a Native American tribe and multiple pension funds through the issuance of $60 million worth of tribal bonds. The judge ordered a new trial for one of the men convicted, Devon Archer, concluding that it was not clear that Archer knew that the bond issue was fraudulent, or that he received any personal benefit from it. Abrams said she was thus “left with an unwavering concern that Archer is innocent of the crimes charged.” Archer's conviction was reinstated by the Court of Appeals for the Second Circuit, which clarified the standard for when a district court may grant a new trial, holding that it may not do so "based on the weight of the evidence alone unless the evidence preponderates heavily against the verdict to such an extent that it would be 'manifest injustice' to let the verdict stand." Archer was business partners with Hunter Biden, although Biden was not implicated in the scheme. A lawyer for Hunter Biden has said that he cut ties with those involved when he learned of the conduct alleged.

In July 2018, Judge Abrams presided over the trial in an action brought by Enrichetta Ravina, a former finance professor at Columbia University's Business School against Columbia and a more senior tenured professor, Geert Bekaert, for sex discrimination and retaliation. The jury found that Ravina had not been sexually harassed but that she had been retaliated against by Bekaert, who wrote at least 30 emails calling Ravina "evil" and "crazy," including to a number of industry players at the Federal Reserve Bank, top-tier universities and economic journals.

Personal life
Abrams and her husband, Greg Donald Andres, formerly a partner at Davis Polk & Wardwell. were married in 2001 by Judge Loretta A. Preska. Greg Andres served with Robert Mueller on the Special Counsel investigation.

See also
 List of Jewish American jurists

References

External links

1968 births
Living people
20th-century American lawyers
21st-century American judges
Assistant United States Attorneys
Columbia Law School faculty
Cornell University alumni
Dalton School alumni
Davis Polk & Wardwell lawyers
Judges of the United States District Court for the Southern District of New York
Lawyers from New York City
United States district court judges appointed by Barack Obama
Yale Law School alumni
American women legal scholars
American legal scholars
20th-century American women lawyers
21st-century American women judges